Ta Shing Yacht Building is a yacht builder located in Tainan, Taiwan. The company was founded in 1957 under the Shing Sheng brand name. Between its founding and 2015, the yard has delivered over 1,200 custom-made boats.

Ta Shing designs and builds under its own brand including Taswell, Tashiba, Orion and also as an OEM for Mason, Baba, Panda, Skye, Mystic and Nordhavn. The range includes wooden and fiberglass fishing boats, sailboats, and motoryachts.

History
The founder, CM Juan established Shing Sheng boatyard in 1957. The company began by building fishing vessels, which were distributed all around Taiwan. Later, Shing Sheng became a pioneer, building the first FRP fishing boat in Taiwan. The Ta Shing-built FRP fishing boats were even dedicated to the Panama Government as a special gift from the government of Taiwan. Ta Shing itself was established in 1978.

In March 2006, Tim Juan, son of CM Juan, took his position as president of Ta Shing.

Milestones
1957 Shing Sheng, former TaShing, wooden fishing boat yard established by CM Juan in Tainan City, Taiwan
1960s Shing Sheng innovated FRP fishing boats by brand name of Shing Sheng, being one of the few pioneer of FRP fishing boat in Taiwan
1970s Self own-brand Shing Sheng fishing boats, and OEM for Baba sailboats
1978 Ta Shing Yacht Building Co., Ltd. was established in nearby Anping Harbor in Tainan, Taiwan
1980s Ta Shing builds self own-brand Tashiba sailboats and OEM for Mason sailboats
1990s Ta Shing builds self own-brand Taswell sailboats and OEM for Nordhavn trawlers
2003 Expanded a branch factory (Shing-Her factory) one block away from TaShing yard
2010 Three TaShing-built Boats Returned Back to Mother City Tainan
2016 Ta Shing Yachts resurrects Popular Taswell Brand in Run-Up to TIBS 2016
2017 Ta Shing Yachts is shortlisted for Best Apprenticeship Scheme of IBI-METSTRADE Boat Builder Awards 2017
2019 Ta Shing Yachts is shortlisted for BEST APPRENTICESHIP OR TRAINING SCHEME of IBI-METSTRADE Boat Builder Awards 2019

Boats
Orion 50
Mason 43

See also 
 Maritime industries of Taiwan
 Ocean Alexander
 Horizon Yachts 
 Johnson Yachts
 Tayana Yachts
 Hylas Yachts

References

Ta Shing Yacht Building